

UCI Road World Rankings

World Championships

Olympic Games

UCI World Cup

Single day races (1.1 and 1.2)

Source

Stage races (2.1 and 2.2)

Source

Continental Championships

African Championship

Asian Championships

European Championships (under-23)

Oceania Championships

Pan-American Championships

National Championships

UCI teams

References

See also
 2008 in men's road cycling
 2008 in track cycling

 
 
Women's road cycling by year